The men's pole vault was an event at the 1996 Summer Olympics in Atlanta, Georgia. Thirty-seven athletes from 24 nations competed. The maximum number of athletes per nation had been set at 3 since the 1930 Olympic Congress. The event was won by Jean Galfione of France, the nation's second victory in the event (previously in 1984). Igor Trandenkov took silver, the first medal for Russia in the pole vault (though Trandenkov had himself taken silver in 1992 as well, as part of the Unified Team; Trandenkov was the sixth man to win two medals in the event and the first to do it under two different flags). Similarly, Andrei Tivontchik's bronze was the first for Germany, though both East Germany and West Germany as well as the Unified Team of Germany had previously won medals.

Summary

In the final, the tie between returning silver medalist Igor Trandenkov and Jean Galfione was broke by counting the number of their misses, with Galfione having had one miss earlier in the competition, and Trandenkov having had two misses, meaning that Galfione won gold, while Tradenkov earned second straight silver. Andrei Tivontchik cleared 5.92 on his second attempt to take bronze.

Background

This was the 23rd appearance of the event, which is one of 12 athletics events to have been held at every Summer Olympics. The returning finalists from the 1992 Games were silver medalist Igor Trandenkov of the Unified Team (now representing Russia), bronze medalist Javier García of Spain, and eighth-place finisher Danny Krasnov of Israel. By this competition, Sergey Bubka (gold medalist in 1988 for the Soviet Union, finalist in 1992 for the Unified Team, and now competing for Ukraine) had already pushed the world record to its current state and was the overwhelming favorite to win. But continuing his Olympic curse, Bubka came into the competition with a heel injury and did not make an attempt. To add further injury, his brother Vasiliy Bubka was one of seven athletes unable to clear a height in qualifying. Without Sergey Bubka competing, the field was "wide-open."

Belarus, Kazakhstan, Moldova, Saint Lucia, and Ukraine each made their men's pole vaulting debut. The United States made its 22nd appearance, most of any nation, having missed only the boycotted 1980 Games.

Competition format

The competition used the two-round format introduced in 1912, with results cleared between rounds. Vaulters received three attempts at each height. Ties were broken by the countback rule.

In the qualifying round, the bar was set at 5.20 metres, 5.40 metres, 5.60 metres, and 5.70 metres. All vaulters clearing 5.70 metres advanced to the final. If fewer than 12 cleared that height, the top 12 (including ties, after applying the countback rules) advanced.

In the final, the bar was set at 5.40 metres, 5.60 metres, 5.70 metres, 5.80 metres, 5.86 metres, 5.92 metres, 5.97 metres, and 6.02 metres.

Records

These were the standing world and Olympic records (in metres) prior to the 1996 Summer Olympics.

The three medalists (Jean Galfione, Igor Trandenkov, and Andrei Tivontchik) all cleared 5.92 metres, breaking the Olympic record. None succeeded at any higher attempts.

Schedule

All times are Eastern Daylight Time (UTC-4)

Results

Qualifying

The qualifying round was held on Wednesday July 31, 1996. Qualification rule: Qualifying performance 5.70 (Q) or at least 12 best performers (q) advance to the final.

Final

The final was held on Friday August 2, 1996.

References

External links
 Official Report
 Results

P
Pole vault at the Olympics
Men's events at the 1996 Summer Olympics